The Young Greens of Aotearoa New Zealand (or simply Young Greens) is the youth wing of the Green Party of Aotearoa New Zealand, and a member of the Global Young Greens. The Young Greens represent Green Party members 35 years of age and under. The Young Greens were founded by MP and then Young Green Gareth Hughes in 2006.

Activities

Campaigns 
The Young Greens have been involved in several different political campaigns, particularly around issues that affect youth. These include Keep It 18, which opposed raising the drinking age from 18 to 21; and petitioning parliament to ban conversion therapy, in a joint effort with fellow youth wing Young Labour.

Summer camp 
Each summer, a camp is traditionally held at Jeanette Fitzsimons' farm in the Coromandel Peninsula.

Structure

Executive 
The Young Greens have a national executive, consisting of two co-convenors, a secretary, a membership secretary, a treasurer, Pou Tikanga, two social media coordinators, a Global Young Greens representatives, an equity officer, and a campus co-ordinator.

Campus groups 
The Young Greens have a presence at New Zealand's largest universities. As of 2018, there are Young Green campus groups at 7 universities.

Office holders

Current members of parliament 

 Chlöe Swarbrick (2017–present)
 Ricardo Menéndez March (2020–present)

Former members of parliament 

 Holly Walker (2011–2014)
 Gareth Hughes (2010–2020)

Co-convenors 

 2007 – Gareth Hughes
 2008 – Gareth Hughes/Luke Stewart
 2009 – Georgina Morrison and Zack Dorner
 2010 – Holly Walker and Aaryn Barlow
 2011 – Brooklynne Kennedy and Vernon Tava
 2012 – Izzy Lomax-Sawyers and Jackson James Wood
 2013 – Lucy Gordon and Philip Nannestad 
 2014 – Terri Gough and Zane McCarthy
 2015 – Ana Martin and Zane McCarthy
 2016 – Ana Martin and Ben Ogilvie/Ricardo Menéndez March
 2017 – Meg Williams and Elliot Crossan 
 2018 – Mona Oliver and Max Tweedie
 2019 – Kelsey Lee and Danielle Marks
 2020 – Matariki Roche and Danielle Marks
 2021 – Lourdes Vano and Rohan O'Neill-Stevens
 2022 – Gina Dao-McLay and M Grace-Stent

Notable alumni
 Ricardo Menéndez March – Member of Parliament
 Holly Walker – Member of Parliament
 Gareth Hughes – Member of Parliament
 Vernon Tava – leader of Sustainable New Zealand Party

Further reading
The Young Greens holding space at the table - a short documentary following the group's co-leaders prior to the 2020 election

See also
Green Party of Aotearoa New Zealand
Global Young Greens

References

External links
 Official website

Green Party of Aotearoa New Zealand
Youth politics
Youth wings of green parties
Youth wings of political parties in New Zealand